{{DISPLAYTITLE:C20H28O}}
The molecular formula C20H28O (molar mass: 284.436 g/mol) may refer to:

 Cingestol
 Delanterone, a steroidal antiandrogen
 Lynestrenol, a progestogen hormone
 Retinal, one of the three forms of vitamin A
 Tigestol
 Vitamin_A2